Carasinol B is a stilbenoid tetramer found in Caragana sinica (Chinese : Jin Que-gen).

Acid-catalyzed epimerization of kobophenol A to carasinol B can be performed in vitro.

References 

Resveratrol oligomers
Natural phenol tetramers